The first election to the Carmarthenshire County Council was held in January 1889. It was followed by the 1892 election.

Overview of the result

1889 was one of those landmark years in the history of Welsh Liberalism, a coming of age symbolized by the triumph across Wales of Liberal candidates in the inaugural county council elections.

Candidates

Most of the seats were contested by Liberal and Conservative candidates, although in a number of cases rival Liberals fought each other. The number of unopposed returns was small.

Outcome

There were a large number of contested elections and the majorities were small in most instances. The Liberals won a large majority of the seats with only nine Conservatives returned. There were also two Liberal Unionists, in Carmarthen and Llansteffan.

The Liberal victory was later auegmnented by the election of fourteen Liberals as aldermen, as opposed to three Conservatives.

This was the inaugural county election and therefore no comparison can be made with the previous elections. In some cases there is an ambiguity in the sources over the party affiliations and this is explained below where relevant.

Ward results

Abergwili

Bettws

Caio

Carmarthen Eastern Ward (Lower Division)

Carmarthen Eastern Ward (Upper Division)

Carmarthen Western Ward (Lower Division)

Carmarthen Western Ward (Upper Division)

Cenarth

Cilycwm

Conwil

Kidwelly

Laugharne

Llanarthney

Llandebie

Llandilo Rural

Llandilo Urban

Llandovery

Llanedy

Llanegwad

Llanelly Rural and Ward No.1 (six seats)

Llanelly Ward No.2 (three seats)

Llanelly Ward No.3 (two seats)

Llanfihangel Aberbythick

Llanfihangel-ar-Arth

Llangadock

Llangeler

Llangendeirne

Llangennech

Llangunnor

Llanon

Llansawel

Llanstephan
Thomas Morris of Coomb was the son of William Morris, former Liberal MP for Carmarthen Boroughs.

Llanybyther

Mothvey

Pembrey (two seats)

Quarter Bach

Rhydcymmerai

St Clears

St Ishmael
J. Lewis Philipps of Bolahaul, near Carmarthen, had been a prominent figure in county government for many years and was chairman of the Carmarthen Board of Guardians from 1861 until 1884.

Trelech

Whitland and Llanboidy (two seats)

Election of Aldermen

In addition to the 51 councillors the council consisted of 17 county aldermen. Aldermen were elected by the council, and served a six-year term. Following the election of the initial sixteen aldermen, half of the aldermanic bench would be  elected every three years following the triennial council election. After the initial elections, there were seventeen aldermanic vacancies and the following Alderman were appointed by the newly elected council (with the number of votes cast recorded in each case). A second vote was held to determine which aldermen should retire in three years.

Elected for six years
John James, Llandovery (from outside the Council) 40
W.O. Brigstocke JP, Liberal (from outside the Council) 38
David Randell MP, Liberal (from outside the Council) 38
Dr J.A. Jones, Llanelly, Liberal (from outside the Council) 37
H. Nevill, Llanelli, Conservative (from outside the Council) 36
T. Williams, Llwynhendy, Liberal (from outside the Council) 33
D. Richards, Ammanford, Liberal (defeated candidate at Llandebie) 30
Joseph Joseph, Liberal (from outside the Council) 27
W.R. Edwards, Carmarthen, Liberal (from outside the Council)

Elected for three years
Col. Gwynnne Hughes JP, Liberal (from outside the Council) 36
J. Lewis Philipps, Carmarthen, Conservative (elected councillor for St Ishmaels) 35
Sir James Hills-Johnes, Conservative (defeated candidate at Caeo) 35
W. de G. Warren, Tenby, Liberal (from outside the Council) 34
Robert Scourfield, Llanstephan, Liberal (from outside the Council) 33
D. Bowen, Llandeilo, Liberal (from outside the Council) 32
J. Bagnall Evans JP, Liberal (defeated candidate at Whitland and Llanboidy) 31
D. James, Bailibedw, Liberal (from outside the Council) 31

As in Cardiganshire the Liberals agreed that the Conservatives be allocated three aldermanic seats only.  Only John Lewis Philipps was an elected member of the Council.

Initially, Lewis Morris had been elected an alderman but he declined on the basis that he had no sufficient time at his disposal. He was then replaced by W.R. Edwards at the second meeting of the Council.

Aldermanic Vacanies, 1889-1892
David Bowen died a few weeks after his election as alderman, The council resolved to replace him with another representative from the Llandeilo area to serve for the remainder of the three-year term.

Morgan Davies, Llandeilo, Liberal (from outside the Council)

Two vacancies arose in early 1891 following the resignation of W de G Warren and the death of J. Lewis Philipps. The vacancies were filled as follows:

C.E. Morris, Liberal (elected member for Llangunnor)
David Evans, Llanelli, Liberal

As a result of these changes there was one additional Liberal alderman at the expense of the Conservatives.

Morgan Davies died in February 1892, shortly before the end of his term as alderman.

By-elections, 1889-1892

St Ishmaels by-election, 1889
In contrast to the position in other counties only one by-election was caused by the election of aldermen. This was in St Ishmaels where, following the election of John Lewis Philipps as an alderman the Liberal candidate captured the seatafter a contest that took place in heavy snow.

Llanarthney by-election, 1889
Thomas Davies, Bremenda, the member for Llanarthney, died in August 1889 as a result of injuries sustained falling off his horse. Rev R.G. Lawrence of Middleton Hall, an unsuccessful candidate at the election held earlier in the year was returned unopposed.

Pembrey by-election, 1890
A by-election arose in the Pembrey ward following the appointment of William Howell as returning officer for the county.

Carmarthen Western Ward (Upper Division) by-election, 1890
D. Rixon Morgan, the sitting member, resigned late in 1890. Professor D.E. Jones of the Presbyterian College, Carmarthen, was chosen as his replacement as Liberal candidate.

References

1889
1889 Welsh local elections